Danny Dunn Scientific Detective is the fourteenth novel in the Danny Dunn series of juvenile science fiction/adventure books written by Raymond Abrashkin and Jay Williams. The book was first published in 1976.

Plot introduction 
Professor Bullfinch and Doctor Grimes are working on more scientific ways to fight crime. Danny is facing an issue at school and needs to borrow the equipment to solve the school mystery.

Editions 
McGraw-Hill
 (Paperback, 1976, illustrated by Paul Sagsoorian)
 (Hardback, 1976, illustrated by Paul Sagsoorian)

MacDonald and Jane's
 (Hardback, 1976, illustrated by Anne Mieke)

Archway Books
 (Paperback, 1977, #3 in their series)

Pocket Books
 (Paperback, 1983 reissue, illustrated by Paul Sagsoorian)

 
1976 American novels
1976 children's books
1976 science fiction novels
Children's mystery novels